Anna Calder-Marshall (born 11 January 1947) is an English stage, film and television actress.

Personal life
Calder-Marshall was born in Kensington, London, and is the daughter of the novelist and essayist Arthur Calder-Marshall and documentary screenplay-writer Ara (born Violet Nancy Sales). Calder-Marshall's husband is the actor David Burke and they have a son Tom Burke, who is also an actor.

Filmography

She also appeared in the Inspector Morse episode The Settling of the Sun (1988) and the Midsomer Murders episode Garden of Death (2000). In 2005 Calder-Marshall played Maude Abernethie in Poirot's After the Funeral.

Other roles include appearing in Harlots as Mrs. May, and in the 2018 BBC adaptation of Les Misérables as Madame Rully. In 2022, she played Janice Beattie in the fifth season of Strike, acting opposite her son, actor Tom Burke who plays Strike.

References

External links

1947 births
English film actresses
English television actresses
Living people
Actresses from London
People from Kensington
English stage actresses
20th-century English actresses
21st-century English actresses
Calder Marshall family